The Friends of Rachel Worth is the seventh album by Brisbane indie band The Go-Betweens, released 12 years after their sixth, 16 Lovers Lane. For this album, Robert Forster and Grant McLennan were joined by all members of American indie rock bands Sleater-Kinney and Quasi as well as new bassist Adele Pickvance. The album was recorded in Portland, Oregon at Jackpot! Recording Studio by Larry Crane.

McLennan said, "Rachel felt really natural – it wasn't like Robert and I had separate managers or any of that industry bullshit. We'd always wanted to record in America, too, so that was a real dream. I think it has a really mysterious, otherworldly, 'lost' feel to it."

Reception 

The Friends of Rachel Worth received generally positive critical reviews. It holds a score of 77 out of 100 on the review aggregator website Metacritic, indicating "generally favorable reviews".

Track listing
All music by Robert Forster and Grant McLennan.

 "Magic in Here" (lyrics, McLennan) – 3:52
 "Spirit" (lyrics, Forster) – 3:59
 "The Clock" (lyrics, McLennan) – 4:06
 "German Farmhouse" (lyrics, Forster) – 3:51
 "He Lives My Life" (lyrics, Forster) – 3:58
 "Heart and Home" (lyrics, McLennan) – 3:13
 "Surfing Magazines" (lyrics, Forster) – 4:34
 "Orpheus Beach" (lyrics, McLennan) – 4:48
 "Going Blind" (lyrics, McLennan) – 2:56
 "When She Sang About Angels" (lyrics, Forster) – 4:31

Personnel
The Go-Betweens
Grant McLennan – vocals, guitar
Robert Forster – vocals, guitar, organ
Adele Pickvance – bass, vocals
Janet Weiss – drums, vocals
Sam Coomes – keyboards

Additional personnel
Carrie Brownstein – guitar on "Going Blind"
Corin Tucker – vocals on "Going Blind"
Brent Arnold – cello
Jen Chorowhas – violin

References

External links
The Go-Betweens Official Site – Gobetweens.net

2000 albums
The Go-Betweens albums
Jetset Records albums